Tarkazy (Tarqaźı) is a rural locality (a selo) and the administrative centre of Tarkazinsky Selsoviet, Yermekeyevsky District, Bashkortostan, Russia. The population was 731 as of 2010. There are 5 streets.

Geography 
Tarkazy is located 37 km south of Yermekeyevo (the district's administrative centre) by road. Novotroyevka is the nearest rural locality.

References 

Rural localities in Yermekeyevsky District